The 2011 New Mexico Lobos football team represented the University of New Mexico in the 2011 NCAA Division I FBS football season. The Lobos were led by third-year head coach Mike Locksley for the first four games and by interim head coach George Barlow for the remainder of the season. They played their home games at University Stadium and are members of the Mountain West Conference. They finished the season 1–11, 1–6 in Mountain West play to finish in a three way tie for sixth place.

Recruiting

Schedule

Coaching change
On September 25, 2011, Mike Locksley was relieved of his duties as head coach after an 0–4 start.  Associate head coach and defensive coordinator George Barlow assumed the job on an interim basis for the remainder of the season.

On November 16, New Mexico announced the hiring of former Notre Dame head coach and ESPN analyst Bob Davie as their new head coach beginning in the 2012 season.

Roster

Ricardo Young, Emmanuel McPhearson, Mark Hunter and Carmeiris Stewart left the team after Mike Locksley was fired.

References

New Mexico
New Mexico Lobos football seasons
New Mexico Lobos football